The Farm, also known as The Farm Inc., was an American country music trio consisting of Nick Hoffman (vocals, fiddle), Damien Horne (vocals, keyboard, guitar) and Krista Marie (vocals, guitar). Signed to All In Records in association with Warner Music Nashville and Elektra Records and New Revolution, the trio has released the singles "Home Sweet Home" and "Be Grateful", which have charted on Hot Country Songs. Horne is a former member of John Rich's songwriting group MuzikMafia, while Marie is a former solo artist for Broken Bow Records. Hoffman is the host and producer of the award-winning TV show "Nick's Wild Ride" that airs on Outdoor Channel and played fiddle in Kenny Chesney's road band.  The three met during a songwriting session which included former Western Flyer member Danny Myrick, who also became the group's producer.

Their self-titled debut album, released in 2012, produced two top 40 hits on Country Airplay: "Home Sweet Home" and "Be Grateful". In 2014, they announced a third single, "Mud".

Discography

Studio albums

Singles

Music videos

References

External links

Country music groups from Tennessee
Elektra Records artists
Musical groups established in 2011
American musical trios
2011 establishments in Tennessee